Toby Twirl is a cartoon character created by children's author Sheila Hodgetts for her publisher, Sampson Low, Marston & Co. Ltd. during the 1940s and 1950s. All of the stories are illustrated by Edward Jeffrey.
The first book, Toby in Pogland, was produced in large format and published in 1946. Four other large format books followed. The standard sized annual format, also published in 1946, began a series that continued until 1958, totalling 14 in all. There were also other formats including small strip books, pop-up books and jigsaws. A series of 8 Toby Twirl Tales, each with two stories, were published between 1950 and 1954.

The Stories
Toby Twirl is a young pig who walks upright. He has human hands and feet like Rupert Bear. The character is based upon a soft toy which was made by the wife of Edward Jeffrey.
Toby's friends are Eli (an elephant) and Pete (a penguin), both of whom generally accompany him on his adventures. Most of the stories are written in rhyming couplets. Several of the stories take place in Dillyland, a country of small humans that Toby and friends manage to reach using a miniature railway line with an engine called The Dillypuff crewed by Clem and Joe. There is also a boat called The Dillypaddle. As you'd expect from such stories Toby and friends often accidentally get into trouble or happen upon some villains during their adventures, somehow managing to overcome their difficulties and save the day.

Sheila Hodgetts
Children's author, Sheila Hodgetts (born in 1924), is most famous for her stories about “Toby Twirl”, illustrated by Edward Jeffrey (1898-1978), a noted landscape artist and book and magazine illustrator.

According to Martin Hockley's The Toby Twirl Adventure Books -  A Collector's Guide (Toby Twirl, Ltd., Burghfield Common, 2003, pp 6–7), Sheila Hodgetts was born on 27 January 1924, in Laindon, Essex. Her family moved later near to Eastbourne, Sussex, where she attended Brighton & Hove High School for Girls as a weekly boarder, a common practice at the time, when secondary schooling was not as widely available as now.
During World War II, she joined the WAAF (Women's Auxiliary Air Force) in 1941, and met her husband-to-be who was at that time serving in the RAF (Royal Air Force). They married in 1942 and have (as reported in 2003) two daughters, Tania (born in 1945) and Domini (born in 1948).
In 1946, when her husband was demobilised from the RAF, her family moved to the West Midlands where they have lived ever since.
Hodgetts is reported to have started her writing career in 1943, but no details of any early titles are known.

Hodgetts’ first “Toby Twirl” book was Toby Twirl in Pogland, published in 1946. This story introduced a young male hero, with a human body, and the head (and, at first, twirly tail) of a pig. Toby finds himself in the Kingdom of Pogland, a fairy tale realm, trapped under a spell of sleep. Toby is able to rescue Princess Flower from a wicked witch, breaking the sleeping spell. He also meets a friend, and companion in Toby's later adventures, Peter or Pete the Penguin, who is actually an impulsive black and white penguin about half the size of Toby, and, unlike Toby, wears no clothing.

Sheila Hodgetts is reported (by Hockley) as recalling that she had grown up loving Mary Tourtel's Daily Express newspaper comic strip character, Rupert Bear. To recognise the parallels between Toby Twirl and Rupert Bear, it is useful to consider this in some detail.

Mary Tourtel (1874-1948) was a children's illustrator, married to Herbert Bird Tourtel, an assistant editor of the Daily Express. Tourtel devised Rupert Bear shortly after the end of World War I, in 1920, when the Daily Express was in competition with The Daily Mail and its then popular comic strip “Teddy Tail” (featuring a mouse called “Teddy Tail”), as well as with the comic strip “Pip, Squeak and Wilfred” (respectively, these are the names of a dog, penguin, and rabbit) in the Daily Mirror. 
Each panel of Tourtel's comic strip story was accompanied by a narrative in rhymed verse. These are the very first (Daily Express, 8 November 1920):
  Two jolly bears once lived in a wood,
    Their little son lived there too.
  One day his mother sent him off
    The marketing to do.
  She wanted honey, fruit, and eggs,
    And told him not to stray,
  For many things might happen to
     Small bears who lost their way.
(Through the 1920s and 1930s, it is unclear who was the creator of the verses used in Rupert's stories. For example, Caroline G. Bott's The Life and Works of Alfred Bestall: Illustrator of Rupert Bear, Bloomsbury, London, 2003, pp 71, 72, reports Alfred Bestall's recollections that, in 1935, “a lady … did Mary Tourtel’s late verse captions (not Hilda Coe)”, and also that her husband, H.B. Tourtel had “[written] the verse”. Similarly, when Bestall was assigned the task of replacing Tourtel after she retired, Bott quotes at length a Daily Express article by Hilda Coe, 7 November 1945, on the anniversary of Rupert's Silver Jubilee. According to Coe, when Bestall began on 28 June 1935, “he could not write verse, and the youngest readers demanded verse, not once but many times. And so, early in 1936, the Daily Express asked me [Coe] to translate Rupert into verse”: Bott p 27.)
The title of this very first “Rupert Bear” newspaper comic strip was “Little Lost Bear”. It also had a short explanatory subtitle: “Mrs. Bear sends her little son Rupert to market”.
Rupert Bear had the body of a human boy, and the head of a bear. Many of his friends had human bodies and animal heads, although other characters included humans, dwarves, ogres, and talking birds. 
Although Rupert, his family, and neighbourhood friends, live in Nutwood, an otherwise ordinary English village, Rupert often found himself stepping into fairy tale regions or distant lands. When Tourtel retired from creating Rupert Bear stories in 1935, the stories were quickly continued in 1935 by Alfred Bestall until he also retired from his work on Rupert stories in 1965.

Sheila Hodgetts was the daughter of the Managing Director of Sampson, Low, at that time a major children's publishing company, with the publishing rights for Tourtel's Rupert Bear Stories, and, later, Enid Blyton's “Noddy” stories, and many others.
Hodgetts says, “After Mary Tourtel died, my father asked me to write something in the same vein to replace them, and so Toby was born” (Hockley p 7).
In fact, as noted, Rupert Bear stories continued to be written and illustrated by Alfred Bestall, from 1935, when Mary Tourtel retired. Moreover, Tourtel died in 1948, two years after Toby Twirl first appeared. Clearly, Hodgetts was not replacing Rupert after Tourtel died, but was adding to Sampson, Low's publication list when wartime restrictions (such as paper rationing) were being lifted and new marketing opportunities beckoned.

In this first story, Toby Twirl in Pogland, we meet Toby Twirl at the beach:

  Toby Twirl strolled by the sea,
    Wondering what to do,
  When he saw a little rowing boat
    So across the sand he flew.
  A man was busy mending nets.
    Toby went up and said,
  “Could you tell me if that boat’s for hire?”
    But the man just shook his head.
  He looked young Toby up and down.
    “How much?” he then enquired.
  So after a lot of argument
    The rowing boat was hired.
  Then Toby Twirl jumped in at once,
    Thrilled by his lucky find.
  He rowed with all his might and main
    To leave the shore behind.
  When suddenly, some distance off
    He spied a mighty bird.
  He trembled as it nearer came,
    And the beat of wings he heard.
  The bird picked Toby from the boat,
    And held him in its beak.
  Toby struggled and cried for help
    Until he was tired and weak.
[Sub-heading for the next page: Toby Listens to the Bird's Sad Story]
  For hours and hours the bird flew on,
    Uttering not a sound.
  Then all at once it glided down
    And set him on the ground.
  Toby was dazed by his long flight,
    “Please take me home,” he cried.
  “No, Toby Twirl, I need your help,”
    The great black bird replied.
  “I’ve heard of many things you’ve done,
    Of Witches killed by you.
  Please help me for I cannot think
    What I am going to do.”
  Toby, quite touched by this appeal
    Said, “Won’t you tell me why
  You are so worried and distressed>
    To help you then I will try.”
  “Well,” said the bird, “it started thus
    A Prince I used to be.
  I loved a Princess kind and fair,
    And she also loved me.”
  “Her worthy father, King of Pog,
    Consented to the match.
  But in his kingdom lived a Witch,
    Who wicked plans did hatch.”
         ... and so the mystery, and adventure, and danger, unfolds, ...

Nothing in Toby Twirl's later adventures explains this earlier history - famed as a Witch killer, and “many things” – of a seemingly ordinary pig-headed young boy wearing overalls (initially blue, but soon to be a trade-mark red) who enjoys a holiday at the seaside.
Importantly, many parallels with Tourtel's and Bestall's Rupert Bear are already clear. Other minor details include the use of running sub-headings that flag the next step in the story: “Toby Listens to the Bird’s Sad Story”.
Obviously Tourtel's rhymed quatrains (or whoever devised the quatrains that accompanied Tourtel's comic strip panels and visual narrative) have been borrowed, including Tourtel's occasional archaisms, and convoluting of the order of words for the sake of the generally strict rhythm, and to manage end-rhymes, with strong pauses at the ends of lines – such as, “A Prince I used to be”, and, “Who wicked plans did hatch”.
In some later Toby Twirl stories, Hodgetts uses prose for the narrative, but most of her Toby Twirl stories rely on quatrains.

By 1946, Alfred Bestall had been creating fresh Rupert stories for ten years, to some extent continuing Tourtel's version of Rupert, but on advice from the Daily Express (Bott quotes Bestall recalling that Tourtel's husband, “H.B. Tourtel … had been a restraining factor over Mary’s tendency towards the horrific”, that is, “the brothers Grimm”: Bott p 72) Bestall deliberately moderated some of Tourtel's more gothic extremes. Bestall's Rupert stories contain, for example, no witches, and none of the ogres and wicked monsters that Tourtel often thrust at Rupert, as though a world of Grimms’ fairy tales loomed in the heart of the dark forest, or behind a high stone wall, or at the end of a long and lonely road. 
But here, with Hodgetts’ first story about Toby Twirl we return to Tourtel's medieval Grimms’-like milieu of dark magic.

The big black bird, who was once a Prince, quickly explains to Toby that this Witch has an Ugly Son, who also loves the Princess, and the Witch can conjure Evil Sprites within her cauldron on the fiery hearth (the capital-initial letters not only name characters they emphasise the malevolence). The Witch casts a magic spell that turns the King of Pog's people into horrid toads, transforms the Prince into a bird of prey, makes the King dangerously ill, and takes Princess Flower away to a secret hiding place. 
Naturally, Toby is keen to do what he can to help the Prince, ...

As with Tourtel, much depends on coincidence – the prince-bird happening to find Toby, vulnerable and alone out at sea; the golden stone walls of the castle of the King of Pog that Toby and the prince-bird happen to reach at the end of their first day of searching (walking, now, not flying) – and that thin veil or border between a normal world of a seaside holiday and the dangerous world of magic, witches, and demonic evil.

Sheila Hodgetts’ artistic collaborator, Edward Jeffrey, created Toby Twirl, visually (albeit, in a Rupert-like mould), basing Toby on a soft toy that his wife was making at the time. Hodgett's must have explained, also, that the name “Twirl”, related to the pig-features of the character, and, by implication, Toby's parents, including, in the early stories, an eponymous pig's twirly corkscrew tail.
Before illustrating the first of the stories, Toby Twirl in Pogland, Edward Jeffrey had worked for the publishing company, Sampson, Low, producing a large number of book-cover illustrations for adult novels. 
According to Martin Hockley, he had also worked on the newspaper strips for Rupert Bear (perhaps filling a gap between Tourtel and Bestall, or more likely providing promotional Rupert images in end-pages of non-Rupert books published by the company, as happened later with the softback edition of Toby Twirl in Pogland by Sheila Hodgetts. Illustrated by E. Jeffrey. 1947. Large format softback with Rupert Advert”   as reported by Abe Books).
Jeffrey was the obvious choice of illustrator for the new Sampson, Low creation, Toby Twirl.
From the outset, Edward Jeffrey's illustrations similarly adopt the brothers Grimm's visual tones of Mary Tourtel's illustrations. The Witch looks suitably wicked; her Ugly Son is hard-faced and clearly a stunted homunculus with a humped shoulder; the Evil Sprites are miniature red devils with horns and forked tails. The clothes worn by the King, the Princess, and his courtiers, are obviously medieval gowns, doublets, ermine cloaks, tights, crowns, and regalia.

But Sheila Hodgetts’ career as the poet-creator of Toby Twirl goes well beyond her vigorous variants of Mary Tourtel's Grimms’ fairy tale version of Rupert, just as Tourtel herself had been happy to have stories of Rupert set in a realistic modern world of farms and cottages, children's games, village shops and a village school, with not a hint of magic, but just a bit of adventure.

Hodgetts is also especially good at the light-hearted and quirky invention of scenario, character and predicament, including: a marzipan man and a town of confectionary people and buildings; a man who is an apple (Pete of Appletown) and servant of an apricot man who is another prince-in-need betrothed to Princess Peach; a clockwork man; a miniature eccentric steam locomotive, the Dilly-Puff, that runs on a rural railway in the land of Lilliputian-small humans ruled by King Dilly, and a corresponding paddle-steamer, the Dilly-Paddle, that plies the gentle by-waters of Paddletown in Dillyland; a Sea Wizard, and, in a separate adventure, an underwater world in which Toby can live without drowning, and meet a Mermaid Princess with a threatening Uncle, and a ferocious Tuffin who has a magic potion that can change the Uncle; old-fashioned pirates; “Arabian Nights” adventures; ... he even finds himself in the Wild West confronting a band of rustlers!

Just as Rupert had his regular friends (most of them with human bodies, and animal heads – all about the same height, regardless of their different animal species - but also some who were all animal, and others who were wholly human), Toby Twirl has some regular friends. These include, Pete the Penguin, Eli the Elephant (also known, formally, as Eli Phant, his mother being Mrs Phant), Winnie the Wallaby, and a squirrel-headed fellow, as well as some less friendly folk, such as Warty Weasel. Adult characters, such as Mrs Twirl (and less frequently, Mr Twirl) tend to appear briefly at the start and end of the stories to express their relief at Toby's safe return. By contrast, Professor Bison (an actual bison, and an obvious homage to Tourtel's and Bestall's character the Wise Old Goat, an actual goat), is of frequent assistance.

Hodgetts sustained Toby Twirl's stories across twelve years of large-format “annuals” - containing several stories, crosswords, board games, colouring-in pictures, and even a Toby Twirl song - from 1946, beginning with The Toby Twirl Annual, through to 1958, Toby Twirl Adventures. These “annuals” were published in time to be purchased as Christmas presents, but after the first volume, were usually simply called “Toby Twirl Adventures”, or something similar, with no mention of “annual” in the title.

Hodgetts also wrote four full-length large-format story books, Toby Twirl in Pogland (1946), Toby Twirl Rescues Prince Apricot (1947), Toby Twirl and the Mermaid Princess (1948), and Toby Twirl and the Magic Ring (1952).

In smaller hard-back format, Hodgetts also wrote eight “Toby Twirl Tales”, from 1949 to 1954, each having two stories. The first of these contained “The Weeping Dragon” and “The Imp of Mischief”, and the last contained “The Patchwork Man” and “The Lost Piccaninny”. (In passing, it must be admitted that occasionally Hodgetts innocently used racial and other features – such as the word “piccaninny” - that would be criticised nowadays by modern political correctness.)

Toby is always looking for something to do, although not always as careful as he might be. For example, in the “annual” Toby Twirl Adventure Stories (1948), which includes a Grimms’-like story of enchantment, “Toby Twirl and the Magic Drum”, the following story – which introduces the secondary, but otherwise realistic world of Dillyland – “Toby and the Dilly-Puff”, Toby and his friend Eli Phant are happily wandering around their village neighbourhood.
  They looked around a saw a shed. / “Let’s play there,” Toby cried.
     So they both raced across to it, / And then the door they tried.
  The found that it was only latched / So opened it and saw 
    The quaintest train which they were sure / Had not been there before.
  “THE DILLY-PUFF” was written on / The Engine. Toby said,
    “That’s what it’s called. What fun to find / An engine in this shed.”
  And then they climbed inside the cab / Of the Engine and espied
     A Tinder Box. “Let’s start it up,” / Then Eli quickly cried.
  “All right,” said Toby, so the two / With the Tinder Box soon lit
     The wood and coal in the stoke-hole which / Began to crackle and spit.
  Two levers were inside the cab, / Marked “STOP” and one marked “GO”.
     “Let’s pull it,” Toby cried, “it might / Start up, you never know.
                   … and so on – this clearly bodes ill!

Toby is also always quick to step in to help, or possibly trigger a surprise adventure. For example, in Toby Twirl Tales No. 6 (1952), “The Clockwork Man”:
  To Toby Twirl's astonishment / He saw, one sunny day,
     A Clockwork Man who silently / Stood right in Toby's way.
  Our little friend espied a key / Which lay upon the ground,
     And taking it, without delay / The Clockwork Man he wound.
  “Oh, thank you kindly, sir!” exclaimed / The small man in delight.
     “I was beginning to despair, / For I’ve been here all night.”

Other Toby Twirl materials created by Hodgetts included daily newspaper comic strips, such as for The Yorkshire Evening Post, beginning in 1959. These led to several small landscape-format “strip books”, such as Toby Twirl on Dapple Heath and  Toby Twirl and the Talking Poodle (ca. 1954), and Toby Twirl and the Bullfighter, and Toby Twirl and the Marionette. There were also colouring books, magic colouring books (using water), and pop-up books, and jigsaw puzzles.

All of the Toby Twirl artwork was by Edward Jeffrey, with some additional colour-work and puzzle pages by R.S. Clark, one of Jeffrey's friends and artistic colleagues. (Clark, best known for his watercolours, is specially credited with the colour-work for the “annual” Toby Twirl Adventures of 1953.)

With Jeffrey's illustrations, Sheila Hodgetts also published two non-Toby-Twirl titles: the fairy tale story, The Sleeping City (1947), in which, of course, a magic spell must be broken to wake a sleeping city; and One Magic Night (1947), in which young Terence ventures out, one magic night, to watch the fairies dance, but is bound in magic cobweb by some unpleasant pixies, until a friend, Rufus, a rabbit, brings the Fairy Queen to rescue the boy.

Working with several other illustrators (none with the pictorial quality of Jeffrey's art), Hodgetts had an extensive career as an author for several other series of children's books in the 1950s and early 1960s. These included “Sleepy Time Tales” - such as Sleepy Time Tales of Primrose Wood - a series of books that contained fifteen, or twelve, short (five minute) bedtime stories, often with a gentle moral at the end, and a light sense of humour, set in different locales, also including Apricot Farm, Happytown, Puddletown, Candytop Castle, Cuddleytown, Playtime Village, Playtown, Faraway Forest, The Pan Babies, and Sleepy Time Tales of the Little Cherubs. (More than one hundred short stories!)

A totally different series featured the “Adventure Twins”, with daring deeds in helicopters and racing cars appearing on the front-covers: The Adventure Twins Take a Chance (1953), and Thrills With the Adventure Twins (1954). Both of these contain several short stories, the former including: Jungle Treasure, Spies on Rock Island, The Sacred Cobra, The Emperor's Daughter, and Adventure in the Desert.

Hodgetts also created several other titles within a series of “Cherub story” books (with a winged cherub appearing on the front cover as a series logo). For example, The Brave Little Cowboy (1952), illustrated by R. MacGillivray, tells the adventures of Little Tex, the bravest cowboy in the Wild West who rides The Range to find adventures with his trusty pony, Ranger. Other titles included The Lost Baby Fairy, Little Kanga’s Pocket, and The Little Red Lorry (1952), this latter illustrated by Vera Rice-Jay. Sampson, Low, and later, Sampson, Low, Marston, and also Purnell, provided a willing venue for all of Hodgetts’ writing.

As recently as 2007, Sheila Hodgetts was involved in the creation and release of a new Toby Twirl book, Toby Twirl and the Reindeer–A Christmas Story and Activity Sticker Book (published in 2007 by Toby Twirl Ltd.) This seems to be a fresh edition of an earlier story, “The Lame Reindeer”, which initially appeared in the 1957 “annual” Toby Twirl Adventures (1957). The new book includes illustrations by Edward Jeffrey, who died in 1978. The story, in prose, tells how Toby Twirl and some of his friends, including Eli, Pete, and others, find Father Christmas stranded in the snow outside their village. The reindeer pulling the sleigh has a stone in its hoof. Naturally Toby offers to help, and, while Father Christmas catches forty winks under a rug, Toby and his friends help the hobbling reindeer get to the village where the cheerful local blacksmith is able to remove the stone, and sooth the reindeer's hoof, ...

Toby Twirl (born in 1946), would have been at least sixty-one in 2007, but he doesn’t seem a day over ten, and still as resourceful as ever!

In Christopher Fowler's column for The Independent, “Invisible Ink: No 199 - Sheila Hodgetts” (Sunday 17 November 2013), Fowler begins: 
“This is a first; I can’t discover anything about Sheila Hodgetts at all. It’s as if she hid herself entirely.”
That may have been true in 2013, but a great deal can be gleaned, about Hodgetts, and about her work with Edward Jeffrey, from the internet, and Martin Hockley's brief account of Hodgetts and her work is still available.

Although Sheila Hodgetts’ writing career spanned far beyond Toby Twirl, it is Toby and his adventures she is remembered for, and will be, deservedly so, very ably brought to visual life by Edward Jeffrey.

References

External links
Official Toby Twirl website
E. Jeffery page with illustrations from the books
Wrinkly Towers Toby Twirl page

Male characters in literature
Fictional pigs
Comics characters introduced in 1946
British comic strips
Sampson Low books